Nikolay Sergeevich Apalikov (born on 26 August 1982) is a Russian volleyball player. He was born in Orsk, Orenburg Oblast, USSR.  He was part of the Russian team that won the gold medal at the 2012 Summer Olympics.

Career
started his professional career in Lokomotiv-Izumrud, the team based in Ekaterinburg. Nikolay won the 2011–12 CEV Champions League playing with Zenit Kazan. He also won the Best Blocker award in that competition.

Awards

Individuals
 2011–12 CEV Champions League "Best Blocker"

Clubs
 2008/09, 2009/10, 2010/11 Russian Men's Volleyball Championship
 2000/01, 2007/08, 2009/10 Russian Men's Volleyball Cup
 2007–08 CEV Champions League -  Champion, Dynamo-Tattransgaz
 2010–11 CEV Champions League -  Runner-up, with Zenit Kazan
 2011–12 CEV Champions League -  Champion, with Zenit Kazan
 2014–15 CEV Champions League -  Champion, with Zenit Kazan

National team
 2005 European Volleyball Championship
 2011 World League
 2011 World Cup

References

External links
 Apalikov`s page on the VC Zenit-Kazan's site

1982 births
Living people
People from Orsk
Russian men's volleyball players
Volleyball players at the 2012 Summer Olympics
Olympic gold medalists for Russia
Olympic medalists in volleyball
Medalists at the 2012 Summer Olympics
Olympic volleyball players of Russia
VC Zenit Kazan players
Sportspeople from Orenburg Oblast